Les Diableries is the title of a series of stereoscopic photographs published in Paris during the 1860s. The photographs, commonly known as stereoviews, portray sculpted clay vignettes which depict scenes of daily life in Hell. Much of the subject matter was satirical and mirrored the corruption and excess of Paris during the Second Empire. Napoleon III’s authoritarian rule was repeatedly the subject of criticism, as was the decadent lifestyle of the bourgeoisie.

Creation and publication
At least three sculptors are known to have created vignettes for the series: Louis Alfred Habert, Pierre Adolph Hennetier, and Louis Edmond Cougny. The series was originally published by Francois Benjamin Lamiche but was later taken over and expanded by the publisher Adolph Block. A total of 72 scenes were published by Block. Many similar stereoviews, though of lesser quality, were subsequently published by a competitor of Adolph Block’s named Jules Marinier.

Construction
The photographs were reverse colored by hand, then backed with a layer of tissue paper and sandwiched between two double window cardboard mattes. This format of stereoview is known as a "tissue view" or "hold-to-light view" and is similar to modern day slides or transparencies. For added effect, the eyes of the skeletons and various other creatures were pierced and dabbed with colored gelatin, causing their eyes to glow red. The final product was then viewed through a stereoscope which produced a realistic 3D effect.

References

Further reading
 
 Mitchell Kaba - Les Diableries: 3D Visions of Hell from the 19th Century

External links
 Diableries - French Devil Tissue Stereos, London Stereoscopic Company
 Les Diableries: Image Samples

Stereoscopic photography